Puccinia liliacearum is a rust on Ornithogalum species. It is a microcyclic species lacking aecia and uredinia. It was described from Ornithogalum umbellatum in France, and it is common in Europe and Asia. It has been introduced to North America. In the United States of America, the first records are from New York in 1971 and Pennsylvania in 1972. It has since spread south to Maryland and east to Indiana.

References

Fungal plant pathogens and diseases